Daniel James Hall  (born 30 November 1974 in Chertsey, Surrey) is a field hockey striker from England, who participated in three Summer Olympics for Great Britain: in 1996, 2000 and 2004. He has played club hockey for Guildford, East Grinstead and Holcombe.

References

External links
 

1974 births
Living people
English male field hockey players
Male field hockey forwards
Olympic field hockey players of Great Britain
British male field hockey players
Field hockey players at the 1996 Summer Olympics
Field hockey players at the 2000 Summer Olympics
2002 Men's Hockey World Cup players
Field hockey players at the 2004 Summer Olympics
Guildford Hockey Club players
East Grinstead Hockey Club players
Holcombe Hockey Club players
Sportspeople from Chertsey